Mariusz Fornalczyk (born 15 January 2003) is a Polish professional footballer who plays as a winger for Bruk-Bet Termalica Nieciecza, on loan from Pogoń Szczecin.

Career

At the age of 15, Fornalczyk debuted for Polish fifth division side Polonia Bytom.

In 2020, he signed for Pogoń Szczecin in the Polish top flight.

On 23 February 2023, Fornalczyk was loaned until the end of the season to I liga side Bruk-Bet Termalica Nieciecza.

References

External links
 
 

2003 births
Living people
Sportspeople from Bytom
Polish footballers
Association football midfielders
Ekstraklasa players
I liga players
III liga players
Polonia Bytom players
Pogoń Szczecin players
Bruk-Bet Termalica Nieciecza players
Poland youth international footballers
Poland under-21 international footballers